Mallosoma is a genus of beetles in the family Cerambycidae, containing the following species:

 Mallosoma piptadeniae Giacomel, 1976
 Mallosoma scutellare White, 1853
 Mallosoma zonatum (Sahlberg, 1823)

References

Heteropsini